Shahrood market is related to the Qajar dynasty and is located in Shahrud, the old texture of the city.

Sources 

Buildings and structures in Shahrud, Iran
Architecture in Iran
National works of Iran
Bazaars in Iran